Hipparinus may refer to:
  Hipparinus, the father of Dion (tyrant of Syracuse) and father-in-law and advisor of Dionysius the Elder
  Hipparinus, tyrant of Syracuse from 352 to 351 BCE and a son of Dionysius the Elder
  Hipparinus, the son of Dion (tyrant of Syracuse)